Isaac Elias (1590 – 1630), was a Dutch Golden Age painter.

Biography
He was probably born in Amsterdam and is known for portraits and genre works.

References
	
	

1590 births
1630 deaths
Dutch Golden Age painters
Dutch male painters
Painters from Amsterdam